The Old City Harbour is the main passenger harbour in Tallinn, Estonia. Regular lines serve routes to Helsinki (Finland), Stockholm (Sweden) and St. Petersburg (Russia).

Overview

Old City Harbour is one of the five ports within the state-owned company Port of Tallinn. It is one of the biggest and busiest passenger harbours in the world and also the biggest passenger harbour in Estonia. The port operates three passenger terminals (A, B and D), total length of its berths is 4.2 kilometres. Vessels with maximum length of 340 metres, 42 metres wide and draught of 10.7 m can enter the port. In 2019, the port served 10.64 million passengers.

The port is operating 339-metre long quay intended for cruise ships. It was completed in spring of year 2004 and its cost at the time was over 80 million kroons. The number of the cruise passengers is increasing steadily, also by the implementing of turnarounds in cooperation with Tallinn Airport. In order to cope with that numbers and increasing size of the cruise ships arriving in Tallinn, Port of Tallinn started in May 2013 the construction of the new quay next to the existing cruise ships quay in the Old City harbour. The total length of the quay built by the Estonian branch of BMGS is 421 metres. With the new quay, the Port of Tallinn is able to moor cruise ships up to 340 metres in length, up to 42 metres in width, and with the draft of up to nine metres. The total cost of the project was 9.34 million euros.

Also Old City Marina - a new marina for recreational vessels established in 2010 - is a part of Tallinn's Old City Harbour.

On 29 September 2017 at the EU Digital Summit in Tallinn, a partnership of Ericsson, Intel and Telia Estonia announced that they had implemented the first live public 5G network in Europe at the Tallinn Passenger Port to connect with Tallink cruise ships at the port.

Carriers and destinations

Regular carriers

Cruise carriers (incl. all cruise ports)

Statistics

Gallery

See also

Baltic Sea cruiseferries
Transport in Estonia

References

External links

 Old City Harbour web page
 Passenger ship schedule
 Map of harbour area
 Ships in Port

Kesklinn, Tallinn
Ports and harbours of Estonia
Transport in Tallinn
Water transport in Estonia
Buildings and structures in Tallinn